Missouri Boys State is an 8-day youth program held each June to teach Missouri high school students leadership and the workings of government.  Missouri is one of forty-nine states (all except Hawaii) with such a program for boys and a separate program for girls sponsored by The American Legion Auxiliary.  The Missouri Boys State program hosts approximately 960 students, or citizens, and more than 130 volunteer staff members for 8 days on the Lindenwood University campus. During the week, the citizens of MBS create a fully functioning mock government   modeled after the State of Missouri.  Citizens are divided into 16 cities, with two cities per county, and into two political parties (Nationalists and Federalists).

History
The concept was originally developed in Illinois in 1934 by Dr. Hays Kennedy and Harold Card, both educators and members of the Illinois American Legion.  The Boys State program was designed to promote democracy, and counteract the fascist principles taught to the youth in Germany.

The individuals responsible for founding the Missouri Boys State program officially in the Spring of 1938 were:
 Jerry F. Duggan (1886 - 1952)
 Harry M. Gambrel (1896 - 1962)
 Dr. Truman L. Ingle (1894 - 1954)
 A. B. Weyer (1889 - 1977)

References

External links
 Missouri Boys State website
 Missouri Boys State Alumni website
 The American Legion website
 The American Legion Department of Missouri website

American Legion
Educational organizations based in the United States
Youth organizations based in Missouri
Youth organizations established in 1938